Thrale is a surname. Notable people with the surname include:

Henry Thrale (1724/1730?–1781), British politician
Hester Thrale (1741–1821), Welsh-born diarist, author, and patron of the arts